The Kwenge River is a stream in the Bandundu Province of the Democratic Republic of the Congo.

The river begins in Angola and then for about  it forms a short part of the Angola–DRC border. It flows north from the Angola border through the Kwango and Kwilu districts, joining the Kwilu River below Kikwit.
Lusanga, formerly Leverville, is at the confluence of the Kwenge and Kwilu rivers.

The land between the Kwilu and the Kwenge was first occupied be the Pende people.
The Suku people, who came to the region from the Kwango River valley in the 1800s, live in the savanna region between the upper Bakali and Kwenge rivers.
The lowest part of the river valley contains strips of periodically or permanently flooded land.

References

Rivers of the Democratic Republic of the Congo
Rivers of Angola
International rivers of Africa
Angola–Democratic Republic of the Congo border
Border rivers